Leif Erickson (born William Wycliffe Anderson; October 27, 1911 – January 29, 1986) was an American stage, film, and television actor.

Early life
Erickson was born in Alameda, California, near San Francisco. He worked as a soloist in a band as vocalist and trombone player, performed in Max Reinhardt's productions, and then gained a small amount of stage experience in a comedy vaudeville act. Initially billed by Paramount Pictures as Glenn Erickson, he began his screen career as a leading man in Westerns.

Military service
Erickson enlisted in the United States Navy during World War II. Rising to the rank of Chief Petty Officer in the Naval Aviation Photographic Unit, he served as a military photographer, shooting film in combat zones, and as an instructor. He was shot down twice in the Pacific, and received two Purple Hearts.

Acting career

Erickson's first films were two 1933 band films with Betty Grable before starting a string of Buster Crabbe Western films based on Zane Grey novels. He went on to appear in films such as The Snake Pit, Sorry, Wrong Number, Abbott and Costello Meet Captain Kidd, Invaders from Mars, On the Waterfront, A Gathering of Eagles, Roustabout, The Carpetbaggers, and Mirage.

One of his more notable roles was as Deborah Kerr's macho husband in the stage and film versions of Tea and Sympathy. He appeared with Greta Garbo, as her brother, in Conquest (1937). He played the role of Pete, the vindictive boat engineer, in the 1951 remake of the famed musical Show Boat. His final appearance in a feature film was in  Twilight's Last Gleaming (1977).

Erickson appeared frequently on television; he was cast as Dr. Hillyer in "Consider Her Ways" (1964) and as Paul White in "The Monkey's Paw—A Retelling" (1965) on CBS's The Alfred Hitchcock Hour.  He is probably best known, however,  for The High Chaparral, which aired on NBC from 1967 until 1971. He portrayed a rancher, Big John Cannon, determined to establish a cattle empire in the Arizona Territory while keeping peace with the Apache. Erickson guest-starred in several television series, including Rawhide, Bonanza (two episodes, 1961–1965), as Aaron Burr in Daniel Boone (two episodes, 1964–1970) Gunsmoke, Marcus Welby, M.D., Medical Center, Longstreet, Cannon, The Rifleman, The Rockford Files, The Rookies, Night Gallery, and the 1977 series Hunter. His final role was in an episode of Fantasy Island in 1984.

Personal life

Erickson was married to actress Frances Farmer from 1936 until 1942. The same day that his divorce from Farmer was finalized, on June 12, 1942, he married actress Margaret Hayes; the marriage lasted only a month. He married Ann Diamond in 1945. The couple had two children: William Leif Erickson, who died in a car accident, and Susan Irene Erickson.

Death
Erickson died of cancer in Pensacola, Florida, on January 29, 1986, aged 74.

Selected filmography

 The Sweetheart of Sigma Chi (1933) as Band Singer with Ted Fio Rito
 Wanderer of the Wasteland (1935) as Lawrence
 Nevada (1935) as Bill Ide
 Drift Fence (1936) as Curley Prentiss
 Desert Gold (1936) as Glenn Kasedon
 Girl of the Ozarks (1936) as Tom Bolton
 College Holiday (1936) as Dick Winters
 Waikiki Wedding (1937) as Dr. Victor Quimby
 Conquest (1937) as Paul Lachinski
 Thrill of a Lifetime (1937) as Howard 'Howdy' Nelson
 The Big Broadcast of 1938 (1938) as Bob Hayes
 Ride a Crooked Mile (1938) as Johnny Simpkins
 ...One Third of a Nation... (1939) as Peter Cortlant
 Nothing but the Truth (1941) as Tommy Van Dusen
 The Blonde from Singapore (1941) as Terry Prescott
 H. M. Pulham, Esq. (1941) as Rodney 'Bo-Jo' Brown
 The Fleet's In (1942) as Jake
 Are Husbands Necessary? (1942) as Bill Stone
 Eagle Squadron (1942) as Johnny M. Coe
 Pardon My Sarong (1942) as Whaba
 Night Monster (1942) as Laurie
 Arabian Nights (1942) as Kamar
 Blonde Savage (1947) as Steve Blake
 The Gangster (1947) as Beaumont
 Sorry, Wrong Number (1948) as Fred Lord
 The Gay Intruders (1948) as Dr. Harold Matson
 The Snake Pit (1948) as Gordon
 Joan of Arc (1948) as Dunois, Bastard of Orleans
 Miss Tatlock's Millions (1948) as Dr. Mason
 The Lady Gambles (1949) as Tony
 Johnny Stool Pigeon (1949) as Pringle
 Mother Didn't Tell Me (1950) as Dr. Bruce Gordon
 Love That Brute (1950) as Elmdale Military Academy Captain (uncredited)
 Stella (1950) as Fred Anderson Jr.
 The Showdown (1950) as Big Mart
 Three Secrets (1950) as Bill Chase
 Dallas (1950) as U.S. Marshal Martin Weatherby
 Fourteen Hours (1951) as Bit Part (uncredited)
 Show Boat (1951) as Pete
 The Tall Target (1951) as Stranger
 Reunion in Reno (1951) as B. Frederick Linaker
 The Cimarron Kid (1952) as Marshal John Sutton
 Sailor Beware (1952) as Cmdr. Lane
 With a Song in My Heart (1952) as General (uncredited)
 Carbine Williams (1952) as Feder
 My Wife's Best Friend (1952) as Nicholas Reed
 Abbott and Costello Meet Captain Kidd (1952) as Morgan
 Never Wave at a WAC (1953) as Sgt. Norbert 'Noisy' Jackson
 Born to the Saddle (1953) as Bob Marshall
 Trouble Along the Way (1953) as Father Provincial aka Ed
 Trial At Tara (1953) as King Laera
 A Perilous Journey (1953) as Richards
 Invaders from Mars (1953) as Mr. George MacLean
 Fort Algiers (1953) as Kalmani
 Captain Scarface (1953) as Sam
 Paris Model (1953) as Edgar Blevins
 On the Waterfront (1954) as Glover, Lead Investigator for Crime Commission
 Star in the Dust (1956) as George Ballard
 The Fastest Gun Alive (1956) as Lou Glover
 Tea and Sympathy (1956) as Bill Reynolds
 Istanbul (1957) as Charlie Boyle
 The Vintage (1957) as Louis Morel
 Kiss Them for Me (1957) as Eddie Turnbill
 Twilight for the Gods (1958) as Harry Hutton
 Once Upon a Horse... (1958) as Granville 'Granny' Dix
 Shoot Out at Big Sag (1962) as Sam Barbee
 A Gathering of Eagles (1963) as Gen. Hewitt
 Strait-Jacket (1964) as Bill Cutler
 The Carpetbaggers (1964) as Jonas Cord Sr.
 Roustabout (1964) as Joe Lean
 Mirage (1965) as Major Crawford Gilcuddy
 I Saw What You Did (1965) as Dave Mannering
 Man and Boy (1971) as Mossman
 Terror in the Sky (1971) as Marty Treleavan
 The Mod Squad (1972) as Lt. Jerry Price
 Night Gallery (1973) as Charlie Wheatland
 Abduction (1975) as Prescott
 Winterhawk (1975) as Guthrie
 Twilight's Last Gleaming (1977) as Ralph Whittaker - CIA Director

See also

References

External links

1911 births
1986 deaths
20th-century American male actors
20th-century American singers
20th-century trombonists
American male film actors
American male television actors
United States Navy personnel of World War II
American trombonists
Male trombonists
Deaths from cancer in Florida
Male actors from San Francisco
Musicians from San Francisco
People from Alameda, California
People from Pensacola, Florida
United States Navy sailors
Western (genre) television actors
20th-century American male singers
Male Western (genre) film actors